Frank "Frenkie" Schinkels (born 9 January 1963 in Rotterdam, Netherlands) is a former professional football midfielder and Austrian international team player and current coach.

Club career
Schinkels started his career in the Feyenoord youth squad. He never represented the club at senior level since Feyenoord manager Jan Mak moved to Sweden's Halmstads BK and took Schinkels with him, making him the first foreign player ever to play for the club. He spent 2 seasons in Sweden before moving back home to the Netherlands to play for AZ Alkmaar and then Excelsior Rotterdam.

After only 2 seasons back in his homeland, he moved to Austria and joined Salzburger AK 1914. While in Austria, he represented a large number of clubs at various levels, having his longest stint with VSE St. Pölten and encountering some success with SV Austria Salzburg, when the club came second in the Bundesliga in 1992–1993 season.

He remained an active player until 2005, during which time he also qualified as an UEFA licensed coach and went on to coach three of his former clubs.

International career
During his time in Austria he gained Austrian citizenship and was chosen to represent the Austria national team in 7 games between 1992 and 1994, scoring 1 goal against the Netherlands.

External links 
 Halmstads BK article and profile 
 

1963 births
Living people
Footballers from Rotterdam
Dutch footballers
Austrian footballers
Dutch football managers
Austrian football managers
Association football midfielders
Allsvenskan players
Eredivisie players
Austrian Football Bundesliga players
Austria international footballers
Feyenoord players
Halmstads BK players
AZ Alkmaar players
SKN St. Pölten players
FK Austria Wien players
Expatriate footballers in Sweden
Expatriate footballers in Austria
FK Austria Wien managers
First Vienna FC managers
SK Austria Kärnten managers